The Next Life may refer to:

Music
The Next Life (EP), by Girls Names, with remixes from their album The New Life, 2013
Next Life (band), a Norwegian progressive, electronic group
"The Next Life", a song by Suede from Suede, 1993
"The Next Life", a song by Tom Cochrane & Red Rider from The Symphony Sessions, 1989

Other media
The Next Life (audio drama), a 2004 Doctor Who audio play
"The Next Life" (The Guardian), a television episode
Next Life, a 2007 video game
The Next Life, a 2012 poetry book by Pat Boran